The Bellingham Festival of Music is a classical music festival held annually in Bellingham, Washington, USA, over several weeks during the summer.  It was established in 1993, with American orchestral conductor Michael Palmer as its Founder and Artistic Director.

The festival's programming features orchestral and chamber music concerts among its events, which over the years have been held at a handful of local venues including Western Washington University, the Mount Baker Theatre, McIntyre Hall in Mount Vernon, and the White Salmon Lodge on the slopes of nearby Mount Baker. 

The resident 40-member Bellingham Festival Orchestra is composed of musicians from major European and North American orchestras.  There is also a Bellingham Festival Chorus which performs with the orchestra on occasion, composed of singers from surrounding Whatcom, Snohomish and Skagit counties who are selected by audition each year.

In an article dated January 13, 2007 the Bellingham Herald reported that there would not be a festival in 2007 due to cash shortfalls, according to Festival officials.  However, 9 months later, in an article published on October 17, 2007 the Herald reported that the Bellingham Festival of Music had successfully reorganized its fiscal affairs and that its concerts would take place again in July 2008, with its board of directors promising a leaner fiscal approach that would be less administratively top-heavy but would maintain high artistic quality, and that Michael Palmer, one of the Festival's founders, would continue in his role as Artistic Director.

The 2008 and 2009 Festivals were successful artistically and financially. The 2010 and 2011 Festivals proved equally successful, according to Festival Treasurer Mary Pat Thuma.

A virtual festival was held in 2020 due to the COVID-19 pandemic.

The 2021 Bellingham Festival of Music took place July 10 - 18, 2021, with a shortened schedule and reduced orchestra.

The 2022 Bellingham Festival of Music will take place July 1 - 24, 2022, with a restoration of the Festival's full orchestral forces and schedule. It will be Michael Palmer's final season as Artistic Director, after which he becomes the Festival's Conductor Laureate.

External links
 Bellingham Festival of Music
 Michael Palmer, conductor
 Bellingham Area Festivals and Events

Notes

Bellingham, Washington
Classical music festivals in the United States
Summer festivals
Tourist attractions in Bellingham, Washington
Music festivals established in 1993
Fairs in Washington (state)